The Yamaha YZ250F is a motocross motorcycle first released in 2001 by Yamaha. It had a five-valve, DOHC, four-stroke engine and initially had a steel frame and an aluminum subframe, which was replaced in the 2006 model with an all-aluminum frame.

This combination leads to the YZ250F being praised for combining the broad-power characteristics of a four-stroke engine with the light handling more common in smaller, 125 cc two-stroke motorcycles.

Significant advances

See also 

Yamaha YZ250
Yamaha YZ125
Yamaha YZ450F
Kawasaki KX100
Yamaha YZ85

References 

 2007 Yamaha YZ250F Specifications

YZ250F
Off-road motorcycles
Motorcycles introduced in 2001